Fehérgyarmat is a town in Szabolcs-Szatmár-Bereg county, in the Northern Great Plain region of eastern Hungary.

Geography

Twin towns – sister cities

Fehérgyarmat is twinned with:
 Nisko, Poland

References

External links

 in Hungarian

Populated places in Szabolcs-Szatmár-Bereg County